Medinilla speciosa is a perennial epiphytic plant in the genus Medinilla of the family Melastomataceae.

Etymology 
Medinilla is named for José de Medinilla y Pineda, who was governor of Mauritius (then known as the Marianne Islands) in 1820.

Description 
The dainty small flowers are bright pink-colored and are produced in large panicles on pendant reddish stems. The flowering period extends from early Summer to Fall. When the blooming is finished for about a month remains a raceme of showy berries, pending that the plant reflowers. These rounded fruits are at first pink and purple-blue when ripe (hence the common name of Showy Asian Grapes.

The plant is utilized as a traditional medicine, by boiling, brewing, or consuming it directly. The fruits are consumed by pregnant women as health supplement and also used as diarrhea, mouth sores, anti-inflammatory, anticancer, and antibacterial treatment.

Distribution 
This plant occurs naturally in Borneo, Java and Philippines. In Borneo, the plant can be found at the Kinabalu in the Malaysian part of the island. Its distribution includes peninsular Malaysia (Penang, Perak, Pahang, Selangor), Java, Sumatra, Lesser Sunda Isl. (Sumbawa, Lombok), Sulawesi, Moluccas and Borneo

Habitat 

Gallery

References

External links

 Biolib

speciosa
Flora of the Philippines